Tingo María Airport  is an airport serving Tingo María, in the Huánuco Region of Peru. The runway is alongside the west bank of the Huallaga River.

The Tingo Maria non-directional beacon (Ident: TGM) is located on the field.

Airlines and destinations

Accidents and incidents 
On December 8, 1967, a Faucett DC-4 airliner, crashed into Mount Carpish at 10,200 feet, shortly before it was scheduled to land at Tingo María on a flight from Huánuco, killing all 66 passengers and six crew.
On May 20, 1989, a US or Peruvian-owned Cessna 208 Caravan (PNP-021) that had left Tingo María on a DEA coca eradication mission taking place in the context of Operation Snowcap, crashed into Mount Huacranacro, 100 km (62.5 mls) east of Huaral. The 9 occupants (six American and three Peruvians) were killed. The plane may have suffered an engine failure.
On February 25, 1994, an Expresso Aéreo Yakovlev Yak-40 (OB-1559), piloted by two Russians and one Peruvian, struck Mount Carpish six minutes after leaving Tingo María, Peru for Lima. The 31 occupants were killed. This crash effectively ended commercial air links between Tingo María and Lima until LC Perú resumed the route in 2012.

See also
Transport in Peru
List of airports in Peru

References

External links
OpenStreetMap - Tingo María
OurAirports - Tingo María
SkyVector Aeronautical Charts

Airports in Peru
Buildings and structures in Huánuco Region